This is a list of episodes for the second season of the 1970s TV series Charlie's Angels. Originally aired from September 14, 1977 to May 10, 1978 for a total of 26 episodes, season two starred Kate Jackson, Jaclyn Smith, David Doyle, and introduced Cheryl Ladd as Kris Munroe, the younger sister of former Angel Jill Munroe (Farrah Fawcett-Majors).

Although there were initial doubts as to whether Ladd could fill the void left by Fawcett-Majors, after her enthusiastic "grand entrance" Kris was warmly welcomed. Co-star Jaclyn Smith said of Ladd: "She had big shoes to fill and she did it with confidence". With Ladd being accepted as Kris, ratings finished in the #4 slot for the season.

Although not an original cast member or character, Cheryl Ladd as Kris gained fame and popularity equal to the original Angels, leading her to become a major star of the series, with several episodes centered on her.

Main cast
Kate Jackson as Sabrina Duncan (regular)
Jaclyn Smith as Kelly Garrett (regular)
Cheryl Ladd as Kris Munroe (regular)
David Doyle as John Bosley (regular)
John Forsythe as Charles "Charlie" Townsend (regular, voice only)

Notable guest stars
Norman Fell
Jim Backus
Phil Silvers
Don Ho 
Craig T. Nelson 
Elaine Joyce 
Judy Landers
Dirk Benedict

Episodes

References

02
1977 American television seasons
1978 American television seasons